Angela Cardoso (born 13 May 1980) is a former Portuguese professional female tennis player.

She has achieved a career-high singles ranking of no. 580 as of 23 April 2001. Career-high doubles ranking of no. 435 as of 21 May 2001. Cardoso made her WTA main draw debut at the 1999 Estoril Open and 2002 Estoril Open in the doubles event partnering Cristina Correia.

Playing for Portugal at the Fed Cup, Cardoso has a win–loss record of 9–9.

Cardoso retired from professional tennis 2003.

ITF Career Finals

Doubles: 2 (0–2)

References

External links  
 
 
 

1980 births
Living people
Portuguese female tennis players
21st-century Portuguese women